Ectocarpene is a sexual attractant, or pheromone, found with several species of brown algae (Phaeophyceae). The substance has a fruity scent and can be sensed by humans when millions of algae gametes swarm the seawater and the females start emitting the substance to attract the male gametes.

Ectocarpene was the first isolated algal pheromone. It was isolated from algae Ectocarpus (order Ectocarpales) by Müller and col. in 1971.  More recent studies have shown that a pre-ectocarpene compound may be responsible for actual attraction of the male gametes.

Moreover, Ectocarpene’s presence, in 2010, has been identified within the Capsicum fruit for the first time. Studies concluded that its "sweet and green" aroma surfaced through identification tests as well as sensory tests. Its relatively low but influential presence helps develop the Capsicum fruit’s profile.

(E)-Ectocarpene is a product associated to a group referred to as Bryophytes, a family of liverworts, algae, and other species with medicinal and nutritional properties. It is suggested that (E)-Ectocarpene may have an evolutionary relationship between families of liverworts and algae as its concentration of formation varies based on the species’ environmental conditions.

All the double bonds are cis and the absolute configuration of the stereocenter is (S).

See also
 Dictyopterene

References

External links 
 Evidence of ectocarpene and dictyopterenes A and C’ in the water of a freshwater lake’

Alkene derivatives
Hydrocarbons
Pheromones
Ectocarpales
Cycloalkenes